James Albert Hargreaves (May 2, 1950 – June 30, 2020) was a Canadian  professional ice hockey defenceman. Hargreaves played junior hockey with the Winnipeg Jets of the Western Canada Hockey League, and was selected in the second round of the 1970 NHL Amateur Draft by the Vancouver Canucks of the National Hockey League. He played 66 games for the Canucks over the next three years, splitting time with their minor league affiliates in the American Hockey League and Western Hockey League. In 1973 he moved to the World Hockey Association (WHA), signing with the professional Winnipeg Jets. After one year in Winnipeg Hargreaves briefly joined the Indianapolis Racers before finishing his career with the San Diego Mariners, finishing with 174 games in the WHA. He retired from hockey in 1976. He died in 2020 at the age of 70.

Career statistics

Regular season and playoffs

Awards
 WCHL All-Star Team – 1970

References

External links

1950 births
2020 deaths
Canadian ice hockey defencemen
Indianapolis Racers players
Rochester Americans players
San Diego Mariners players
Seattle Totems (WHL) players
Ice hockey people from Winnipeg
Vancouver Canucks draft picks
Vancouver Canucks players
Winnipeg Jets (WHA) players
Winnipeg Jets (WHL) players